Wynnefield Avenue station is a SEPTA Regional Rail station in Philadelphia, Pennsylvania. Located at Wynnefield and Bryn Mawr Avenues, it serves the Cynwyd Line. It is the northernmost station on the Cynwyd Line in Philadelphia.

Station layout

References

External links

SEPTA - Wynnefield Avenue Station

SEPTA Regional Rail stations
Former Pennsylvania Railroad stations